is a national research university located in Greater Tokyo Area, Japan. Tokyo Tech is the largest institution for higher education in Japan dedicated to science and technology, one of first five Designated National University and selected as a Top Type university of Top Global University Project by the Japanese government. It is generally considered to be one of the most prestigious universities in Japan.

Tokyo Tech's main campus is located at Ōokayama on the boundary of Meguro and Ota, with its main entrance facing the Ōokayama Station. Other campuses are located in Suzukakedai and Tamachi. Tokyo Tech is organised into 6 schools, within which there are over 40 departments and research centres. Tokyo Tech enrolled 4,734 undergraduates and 1,464 graduate students for 2015–2016. It employs around 1,100 faculty members. Tokyo Institute of Technology produced a Nobel Prize laureate in Chemistry Hideki Shirakawa Ph.D.

History

Foundation and early years (1881–1922)
Tokyo Institute of Technology was founded by the government of Japan as the Tokyo Vocational School on May 26, 1881, 14 years after the Meiji Restoration. To accomplish the quick catch-up to the West, the government expected this school to cultivate new modernized craftsmen and engineers. In 1890, it was renamed Tokyo Technical School. In 1901, it changed name to Tokyo Higher Technical School.

Great Kantō earthquake and World War II (1923–1945)
In early days, the school was located in Kuramae, the eastern area of the Greater Tokyo Area, where many craftsmens' workshops had been since the old Shōgun's era. The buildings in Kuramae campus were destroyed by the Great Kantō earthquake in 1923. In the following year, the Tokyo Higher Technical School moved from Kuramae to the present site in Ookayama, a south suburb of the Greater Tokyo Area. In 1929, the school became Tokyo University of Engineering, later renamed to Tokyo Institute of Technology around 1946, gaining a status of national university, which allowed the university to award degrees. The university had the Research Laboratory of Building Materials in 1934, and five years later, the Research Laboratory of Resources Utilisation and the Research Laboratory of Precision Machinery were constructed. The Research Laboratory of Ceramic Industry was made in 1943, and one year before World War Two ended, the Research Laboratory of Fuel Science and the Research Laboratory of Electronics were founded.

Post-War Era (1946–present)
After World War II, the new education system was promulgated in 1949 with the National School Establishment Law, and Tokyo Institute of Technology was reorganized. Many three-year courses were turned into four-year courses with the start of the School of Engineering this year. The university started graduate programmes in engineering in 1953. In the following year, the six research laboratories were integrated and reorganised into four new labs: the Research Laboratory of Building Materials, the Research Laboratory of Resources Utilization, the Precision and Intelligence Laboratory and the Research Laboratory of Ceramic Industry, and the School of Engineering was renamed the School of Science and Engineering.

Throughout the post-war reconstruction of the 1950s, the high economic growth era of the 1960s, and the aggressive economic era marching to the Bubble Economy of the 1980s, TIT kept providing Japan its leading engineers, researchers, and business persons. Since April 2004, it has been semi-privatized into the National University Incorporation of Tokyo Institute of Technology under a new law which applied to all national universities.

Operating the world-class supercomputer Tsubame 2.0, and making a breakthrough in high-temperature superconductivity, Tokyo Tech is a major centre for supercomputing technology and condensed matter research in the world.

In 2011, it celebrated the 130th anniversary of its founding. In 2014, it joined the edX consortium and formed the Online Education Development Office (OEDO)  to create MOOCS, which are hosted on the edX website.

In its 130 years, Tokyo Tech has provided scientific researchers, engineers and many social leaders, including Naoto Kan who is a former prime minister.

Campuses

Tokyo Tech has three campuses, Ōokayama campus in Ōokayama Meguro as the main campus, Tamachi campus in Shibaura and Suzukakedai campus, located in Nagatsuta, Midori-ku in Yokohama.

 Ōokayama campus
 Tamachi campus
 Suzukakedai campus

Organization

Schools and departments 
TokyoTech comprises 6 schools, a number of departments and Institute for Liberal Arts.
School of Science (ja)
 Department of Mathematics
 Department of Physics
 Department of Chemistry
 Department of Earth and Planetary Science
School of Engineering (ja)
 Department of Mechanical Engineering
 Department of Systems and Control Engineering
 Department of Electrical and Electric Engineering
 Department of Information and Communication Engineering
 Department of Industrial Engineering and Economics
School of Life Science and Technology (ja)
 Department of Life Science and Technology
School of Computing (ja)
 Department of Mathematical and Computing Science
 Department of Computer Science
School of Environment and Society (ja)
 Department of Architecture and Building Engineering
 Department of Civil and Environmental Engineering
 Department of Transdisciplinary Science and Engineering
 Department of Social and Human Sciences
 Technology Innovation Management / Department of Innovation Science
Institute for Liberal Arts

Research laboratories 
Chemical Resources Laboratory
Precision and Intelligence Laboratory
Materials and Structures Laboratory
Research Laboratory for Nuclear Reactors
Quantum Nano Electronics Research Centre
Earth-Life Science Institute (ELSI)

Centers

Politics and social sciences 
Centre for Research in Advanced Financial Technology (Tokyo Institute of Technology)
Precision and Intelligence Laboratory (Tokyo Institute of Technology)
Solutions Research Laboratory
Integrated Research Institute
Global Edge Institute (Tokyo Institute of Technology)
Productive Leader Incubation Platform
Academy for Global Leadership
Centre for Research and Development of Educational Technology (Tokyo Institute of Technology)
Research Centre for Educational Facilities
Creative Research Laboratory
Research Centre for the Science of Institutional Management of Technology
Collaboration Centre for Design and Manufacturing (CODAMA)
Centre for Agent-Based Social Systems Sciences (Tokyo Institute of Technology)
Foreign Language Research and Teaching Centre
Centre for the Study of World Civilisations
Asia-Africa Biology Research Centre
Centre for CompView Research and Education
Career Advancement Professional School
Organization for Life Design and Engineering
Centre for Liberal Arts

Engineering and computing 
Materials and Structure Laboratory (Tokyo Institute of Technology)
Frontier Research Centre
Imaging Science and Engineering Laboratory
Global Scientific Information and Computing Centre
Structural Engineering Research Centre
Super-Mechano Systems R&D Centre
Centre for Photonic Nano-Device Integrated Engineering
Photovoltaics Research Center
Inter-departmental organisation for Informatics

Chemistry and life sciences 
Chemical Resources Laboratory
Research Centre for Carbon Recycling and Energy
Centre for Biological Resources and Informatics
International Research Centre of Macromolecular Science
Bio-Frontier Research Centre
Emerging Nanomaterial Research Centre
Centre for Molecular Science and Technology
The Osmotic Power Research Centre

Physics and astronomy 
Volcanic Fluid Research Centre (Tokyo Institute of Technology)
Research Laboratory for Nuclear Reactors (Tokyo Institute of Technology)
Research Centre for Low Temperature Physics
Quantum Nanoelectronics Research Centre
Centre for Urban Earthquake Engineering
Research Centre for Nanometer-Scale Quantum Physics
Research Centre for the Evolving Earth and Planets
Centre for Research into Innovative Nuclear Energy Systems

Other facilities 
 Asia-Oceania Top University League on Engineering
 Tokyo Tech Archive Initiative
Health Service Centres
TITECH Earth Database Centre
Tokyo Tech Front
International Student Centre
Inter-departmental Organization for Environment and Energy
ICE Cube Centre

Academics

Libraries
The main library  is the Tokyo Institute of Technology Library in Ookayama. It is the home of Japan's largest science and technology library. The library was founded in 1882, and it lost nearly 28,000 books during the Great Kantō earthquake in 1923. Moved to Ookayama in 1936, it has been the national science and technology library of Japan.

1,200 students and staff visit the library each day.
It has 674,000 books and 2,500 journals, including 1,600 foreign academic journals; the number of international research collections is the largest in Japan. It provides around 7,000 registered electronic journals each year. The library is therefore recognised for the outstanding national and international importance and awarded 'Centre of foreign journals' by the government of Japan. Renewal construction of the library was completed in July 2011.

International graduate programmes
Tokyo Tech runs intensive programmes for obtaining master degree or PhD. Called the Tokyo Tech's International Graduate Program, the programmes are targeted at international students of high academic potential who are not Japanese speakers. Lectures and seminars are given in English mainly by Tokyo Tech's faculty members. Programme starting dates are October or April. Public fundings for these courses are also available; those students who have academic excellence may apply for scholarships from the Ministry of Education, Culture, Sports, Science and Technology of Japan.

Academic rankings

Tokyo Tech is one of the most prestigious universities in Japan. It can be seen in the several rankings such as shown below.

General rankings
Tokyo Tech has been ranked 2nd among the Japanese universities according to The Times Higher Education World University Rankings 2021. Tokyo Tech has also ranked 3rd among the best Japanese universities according to QS World University Rankings 2021  Tokyo Tech has also been ranked 2nd (national) in 2011 in the field of Engineering "Entrance score ranking of Japanese universities-Department of Engineering" by Score-navi. In another ranking, Japanese prep school Kawaijuku ranked Tokyo Tech as the 4th best (overall), 2-3rd best in former semester and 1st in latter semester (Department of Engineering) university in Japan (2012).

According to QS World University Rankings, Tokyo Tech was ranked 3rd in Japan and internationally ranked 20th in the field of Engineering and Technology, and 51st in Natural science in 2011. The university was ranked 31st worldwide according to Global University ranking and 57th in 2011 according to QS World University Rankings, 
It was also ranked 31st worldwide according to the Global University Ranking in 2009.

Research performance
Tokyo Tech is one of the top research institutions in natural sciences and technology in Japan. According to Thomson Reuters, its research excellence (Pure science only for this information) is especially distinctive in Materials Science (5th in Japan, 24th in the world), Physics (5th in Japan, 31st in the world), and Chemistry (5th in Japan, 22nd in the world).

Weekly Diamond also reported that Tokyo Tech has the highest research standard in Japan in terms of research fundings per researchers in COE Program. In the same article, it's also ranked 8th in terms of the quality of education by GP funds per student.

In addition, according to the September 2012 survey by QS World University Rankings about the general standards in Engineering and Technology field, Tokyo Tech was placed 19th (world), 2nd (national).

The Tsubame 2.0, which is a large-scale supercomputer in Tokyo Tech, was ranked 5th of the world best-performed computer. 1st in the world as university's owned one, this supercomputer is used for simulation related to the complex systems such as the dynamics of planets or financial systems.

As Tokyo Tech has been emphasizing on 'practical' research, Tokyo Tech got the 2nd place at the number of patents accepted (284) during 2009 among Japanese Universities.

Alumni rankings
Alumni of Tokyo Tech enjoy their good success in Japanese industries. According to (Truly Strong Universities -TSU), the alumni's of Tokyo Tech has been acquiring the highest (1st) employment rate within Japan.

According to the Weekly Economist's 2010 rankings and the PRESIDENT's article on 2006/10/16, graduates from Tokyo Tech have the 2nd best employment rate in 400 major companies, and the average graduate salary is the 9th best in Japan. École des Mines de Paris ranks Tokyo Tech as 92nd in the world in 2011 in terms of the number of alumni listed among CEOs in the 500 largest worldwide companies.  Also, according to the article of The New York Times- Universities with the most employable students ranking 2012, Tokyo Tech ranked 14th place in the world (2nd in Asia, 1st in Japan).

Popularity and selectivity
Tokyo Tech is one of the most selective universities in Japan. Its entrance difficulty is usually considered one of the most difficult in Japan.

Evaluation from Business World

Wildlife
As of 2009, there is a large population of rose-ringed parakeets residing at the main campus of the Tokyo Institute of Technology in Ookayama.

Gallery

Alumni and faculty

See also
 Ken Mogi
 Research Institutes at Tokyo Tech
 Supercomputing in Japan

References

External links

 The Tokyo Tech official web site

 
Educational institutions established in 1881
Japanese national universities
Research institutes in Japan
Technical universities and colleges in Japan
Engineering universities and colleges in Japan
Universities and colleges in Yokohama
Buildings and structures in Meguro
1881 establishments in Japan